Ágata Filipa Pinto Coelho Pimenta (born 17 May 1995) is a Portuguese professional footballer who plays as a defender for Servette and the Portugal women's national team.

Club career
In June 2021 Pimenta transferred from Braga to Scottish Women's Premier League (SWPL) champions Glasgow City. She became the first female player from Portugal to play in Scotland, and shortly afterwards became the first Portuguese female player to score a goal in Scottish football, when she netted in a 6–0 win over Hamilton Academical in the Scottish Women's Premier League Cup.

Pimenta transferred to Swiss Women's Super League club Servette in June 2022, having come to their notice when they played against Glasgow City in the 2021–22 UEFA Women's Champions League qualifying rounds.

International career
Coach Francisco Neto gave Pimenta her first senior Portugal national team cap in a 3–0 friendly win over Ukraine on 20 January 2019 in Torres Novas. She was an 83rd-minute substitute for Jéssica Silva.

Honours
Braga
 Campeonato Nacional Feminino: 2018–19
 Taça de Portugal: 2019–20

References

External links
 
 

1995 births
Living people
People from Barcelos, Portugal
Portuguese women's footballers
Portugal women's international footballers
Women's association football defenders
Portuguese expatriate women's footballers
Expatriate women's footballers in Scotland
FA Women's National League players
Glasgow City F.C. players
Portuguese expatriate sportspeople in Scotland
S.C. Braga (women's football) players
Campeonato Nacional de Futebol Feminino players
Scottish Women's Premier League players
Valadares Gaia F.C. (women) players
Portuguese expatriate sportspeople in Switzerland
Expatriate women's footballers in Switzerland
Servette FC Chênois Féminin players
Swiss Women's Super League players